Landergin may refer to:

People
Patrick H. Landergin (1854-1929), American politician and rancher.

Places
Landergin, Texas, a ghost town in Oldham County, Texas, USA.
Landergin Mesa, an archeological site in Oldham County, Texas, USA.
Landergin-Harrington House, a historic house on the NRHP in Amarillo, Texas, USA.